Wang Hongyou (Chinese: 王宏有; born 23 January 1985) is a Chinese footballer who plays for Zhejiang Greentown in the China League One.

Club career
Wang Hongyou would start is professional career with Zhejiang Greentown in the 2005 league season when he was promoted to their senior team. In the following season he would gain significantly more playing time and was part of the squad that won promotion to the top tier. He would go on to become a vital member of the team and help establish the club in the league until on 5 September 2009 in a league game against Shenzhen FC he was red carded in a 2-1 defeat for violent conduct towards the referee. While he would argue that all he did was pass the ball towards the referee and not throw it at him his behaviour after the sending off where he threw his boots at the referee saw him receive a four match ban and a fine of 20,000 Yuan by the Chinese Football Association.

On 17 January 2010 while out with his girlfriend in a taxi he got into an altercation with the driver. Wang believed the driver was going the wrong way and subsequently hit him on the face. After the incident Wang was detained and bailed out for 25,000 Yuan while at his club he was ordered to leave the team. Hoping to revive his career and get a fresh start Wang moved to second tier club Dalian Aerbin in the 2011 league season. The move would turn out to be a success and he went on to win the division title with them.

On 4 March 2016 Wang joined China League One club Dalian Transcendence and was named as their captain at the start of the season.

On 30 January 2019, Wang returned to Zhejiang Greentown.

Career statistics
Statistics accurate as of match played 31 December 2020.

Honours

Club
Dalian Aerbin
China League One: 2011

References

External links
Player profile at Sodasoccer.com
 

1985 births
Living people
Chinese footballers
Footballers from Dalian
Dalian Professional F.C. players
Zhejiang Professional F.C. players
Dalian Transcendence F.C. players
Chinese Super League players
China League One players
Association football central defenders
Association football fullbacks